The 2011 UK Open Qualifier 5 was the fifth of eight 2011 UK Open Darts Qualifiers which was held at the Metrodome in Barnsley on Saturday 16 April.

Prize money

Draw

References

5